Roger Edwards may refer to:

Roger Nicholas Edwards (1934–2018), British politician and a former Secretary of State for Wales
G. Roger Edwards (1915–2009), American archaeologist and curator for the University of Pennsylvania Museum of Archaeology and Anthropology.
Roger Edwards (Calvinist) (1811–1886), Welsh Calvinistic Methodist
Roger Edwards (politician) (born 1946), Falkland Islands politician
Roger Edwards (meteorologist), American meteorologist and expert on severe convective storms